Arsenic trifluoride is a chemical compound of arsenic and fluorine with the chemical formula AsF3. It is a colorless liquid which reacts readily with water.

Preparation and properties
It can be prepared by reacting hydrogen fluoride, HF, with arsenic trioxide:
6HF + As2O3 → 2AsF3 + 3H2O

It has a pyramidal molecular structure in the gas phase which is also present in the solid. In the gas phase the As-F bond length is 170.6 pm and the F-As-F bond angle 96.2°.

Arsenic trifluoride is used as a fluorinating agent for the conversion of non-metal chlorides to fluorides, in this respect it is less reactive than SbF3.

Salts containing AsF4− anion can be prepared for example CsAsF4. the potassium salt KAs2F7 prepared from KF and AsF3  contains AsF4− and AsF3 molecules with evidence of interaction between the AsF3 molecule and the anion.

AsF3 reacts with SbF5. The product obtained could be described as the ionic compound AsF2+ SbF6−. However, the authors conclude the formed product cannot be viewed only as an ionic compound nor entirely as the neutral adduct AsF3SbF5. The crystal structure displays characteristics of both an ionic pair, and a neutral adduct, taking the middle ground in between both models.

References

Arsenic(III) compounds
Arsenic halides
Fluorides
Fluorinating agents